Grafton County is a county in the U.S. state of New Hampshire. As of the 2020 census, the population was 91,118. Its county seat is North Haverhill, a village within the town of Haverhill. Until 1972, the county courthouse and other offices were in downtown Woodsville, a larger village within the town of Haverhill.

Grafton County is part of the Claremont-Lebanon, NH–VT Micropolitan Statistical Area.

The county is the home of Dartmouth College and Plymouth State University. Progressive Farmer rated Grafton County fourth in its list of the "Best Places to Live in Rural America" in 2006, citing low unemployment (despite slow economic growth), a favorable cost of living, and the presence of White Mountain National Forest, the state's only national forest.

History
Grafton was one of the five counties originally identified for New Hampshire in 1769. It was named for Augustus FitzRoy, 3rd Duke of Grafton, who had been a supporter of American causes in Parliament, and who was serving as British Prime Minister at the time. The county was organized at Woodsville in 1771, and originally included the entire northern frontier of New Hampshire, including several towns now in Vermont. In 1803, the northern area was removed for the formation of Coos County. The three counties to the south were Strafford, Hillsborough and Cheshire, and the eastern edge bordered the "District of Maine". In 1797, the county had 50 townships, 17 locations, and a population of 23,093.

Geography
It is the second-largest county in New Hampshire by area.

Grafton County is heavily rural. About half of its area is in the White Mountain National Forest. Squam Lake, featured in the film On Golden Pond, and the Old Man of the Mountain landmark are here, as are Dartmouth College and the Hubbard Brook Experimental Forest. Many of the 4,000-foot mountains of New Hampshire are within the county. The Appalachian Trail passes through parts of at least ten towns in the county.

Adjacent counties

 Essex County, Vermont (north)
 Coos County (northeast)
 Carroll County (east)
 Belknap County (southeast)
 Merrimack County (south)
 Sullivan County (south)
 Windsor County, Vermont (southwest)
 Orange County, Vermont (west)
 Caledonia County, Vermont (northwest)

National protected area
 White Mountain National Forest (part)

Demographics

2000 census
As of the census of 2000, 81,743 people, 31,598 households, and 20,254 families resided in the county. The population density was 48 people per square mile (18/km2). There were 43,729 housing units at an average density of 26 per square mile (10/km2). The county's racial makeup was 95.76% White, 1.73% Asian, 0.53% Black or African American, 0.31% Native American, 0.03% Pacific Islander, 0.39% from other races, and 1.26% from two or more races. 1.12% of the population were Hispanic or Latino of any race. 19.0% were of English, 12.9% Irish, 11.1% French, 7.8% American, 7.5% German, 6.8% French Canadian and 5.5% Italian ancestry. 95.1% spoke English, 1.5% French and 1.3% Spanish as their first language.

There were 31,598 households, of which 29.50% had children under the age of 18 living with them, 52.40% were married couples living together, 8.30% had a female householder with no husband present, and 35.90% were non-families. 27.40% of all households were made up of individuals, and 9.50% had someone living alone who was 65 years of age or older.  The average household size was 2.38 and the average family size was 2.90.

In the county, the population was spread out, with 21.90% under the age of 18, 13.50% from 18 to 24, 27.00% from 25 to 44, 24.20% from 45 to 64, and 13.40% who were 65 years of age or older. The median age was 37 years. For every 100 females, there were 96.70 males. For every 100 females age 18 and over, there were 94.30 males.

The county's median household income was $41,962, and the median family income was $50,424. Males had a median income of $31,874 versus $25,286 for females. The per capita income for the county was $22,227. About 5.10% of families and 8.60% of the population were below the poverty line, including 8.60% of those under age 18 and 7.50% of those age 65 or over.

2010 census
As of the 2010 United States census, there were 89,118 people, 35,986 households, and 22,074 families in the county. The county's racial makeup was 93.6% white, 3.0% Asian, 0.9% black or African American, 0.4% American Indian, 0.4% from other races, and 1.8% from two or more races. Those of Hispanic or Latino origin made up 1.8% of the population. In terms of ancestry, 23.6% were English, 18.7% were Irish, 10.9% were German, 6.6% were Italian, 5.8% were Scottish, 5.8% were French Canadian, and 5.0% were American.

Of the 35,986 households, 25.8% had children under the age of 18 living with them, 49.0% were married couples living together, 8.4% had a female householder with no husband present, 38.7% were non-families, and 29.4% of all households were made up of individuals. The average household size was 2.28 and the average family size was 2.80. The median age was 41.2 years.

The median household income was $53,075 and the median family income was $66,253. Males had a median income of $43,566 versus $33,535 for females. The per capita income for the county was $28,170. About 5.1% of families and 9.8% of the population were below the poverty line, including 9.8% of those under age 18 and 10.6% of those age 65 or over.

Politics and government
In the 2000 United States presidential election, Al Gore narrowly carried the county over George W. Bush, taking 47.31% of the vote to Bush's 46.71%. Other candidates got a combined 5.98%. In 2004 John Kerry prevailed over Bush by a wider margin: Kerry received 55.74% of the vote, while Bush received 43.17%.  In 2008, Barack Obama carried Grafton by a landslide, receiving 63.03% of the vote to John McCain's 35.45%. It was Obama's highest percentage by county in New Hampshire. In 2016, Hillary Clinton won this county with 55.7%, while Donald Trump received 37.1% of the vote. It was Clinton's highest percentage by county in New Hampshire.

|}

County Commission
The executive power of Grafton County's government is held by three county commissioners, each representing one of the three commissioner districts within the county.

In addition to the County Commission, there are also five directly elected officials: they include County Attorney, Register of Deeds, County Sheriff, Register of Probate, and County Treasurer.

General court
The general court delegation of Grafton County is made up of all of the members of the New Hampshire House of Representatives from the county. There are 26 members from 18 different districts. After the 2022 elections, the party distribution of representatives was as follows.

Media
 WPNH - 1300 AM, Plymouth
 WTSL - 1400 AM, Hanover - News/Talk
 WLTN - 1400 AM, Littleton - Oldies - "Oldies 1400"
 WUVR - 1490 AM, Hanover - Talk
 W217BH - 91.3 FM, Littleton - New Hampshire Public Radio - Simulcast of WEVO in Concord, New Hampshire
 WEVH - 91.3 FM, Hanover - New Hampshire Public Radio
 WPCR - 91.7 FM, Plymouth - Plymouth State University
 WGXL - 92.3 FM, Hanover - Hot Adult Contemporary - "The Valley's Hit Music"
 W231BW - 94.1 FM, Littleton - Classic rock - "The Outlaw" - Simulcast of WOTX in Groveton
 W237CR - 95.3 FM, Littleton - Eclectic Music Mix (Hot AC/Rock/Dance) - "Kiss 102.3" - Simulcast of WXXS in Lancaster
 W240AK - 95.9 FM, Lebanon - Religious - "Alive Radio" - Simulcast of WBAR in Lake Luzerne, New York
 WLTN-FM - 96.7 FM, Lisbon - 1970s-1990s Adult Contemporary - "Mix 96.7"
 W245AF - 96.9 FM, Ashland - "New Hampshire Gospel Radio" - Simulcast of WVNH in Concord, New Hampshire
 W247AO - 97.3 FM, Plymouth - New Hampshire Public Radio - Simulcast of WEVO in Concord, New Hampshire
 W249AW - 97.7 FM, Lebanon - Religious - "Alive Radio" - Simulcast of WBAR in Lake Luzerne, New York
 WFRD - 99.3 FM, Hanover - Active Rock - "99 Rock"
 WPNH - 100.1 FM, Plymouth - "The Planet"
 WXXK - 100.5 FM, Lebanon - Country - "Kixx Country"
 WYKR-FM - 101.3 FM, Haverhill - Country
 W272AU - 102.3 FM, Hanover - Classic rock - "Champ 101.3 & 102.1" - Simulcast of WVXR in Randolph, Vermont
 W280CS - 103.9 FM, Hanover - Vermont Public Radio Classical Channel - Simulcast of WVPR in Burlington, Vermont
 WLKC - 105.7 FM, Campton - "The River" - Simulcast of WXRV in Andover, Massachusetts
 WMTK - 106.3 FM, Littleton - Classic rock - "The Notch"
 W294AB - 106.7 FM, Hanover - Classic rock - "Q106" - Simulcast of WHDQ in Claremont, New Hampshire
 W299AM - 107.7 FM, Lebanon - Christian contemporary - "K-Love" - Simulcast of WZKC in Royalton, Vermont
(Compiled from Radiostationworld.com)

Communities

City
 Lebanon

Towns

 Alexandria
 Ashland
 Bath
 Benton
 Bethlehem
 Bridgewater
 Bristol
 Campton
 Canaan
 Dorchester
 Easton
 Ellsworth
 Enfield
 Franconia
 Grafton
 Groton
 Hanover
 Haverhill (county seat)
 Hebron
 Holderness
 Landaff
 Lincoln
 Lisbon
 Littleton
 Lyman
 Lyme
 Monroe
 Orange
 Orford
 Piermont
 Plymouth
 Rumney
 Sugar Hill
 Thornton
 Warren
 Waterville Valley
 Wentworth
 Woodstock

Township
 Livermore

Census-designated places

 Ashland
 Bethlehem
 Bristol
 Canaan
 Enfield
 Hanover
 Lincoln
 Lisbon
 Littleton
 Mountain Lakes
 North Haverhill
 North Woodstock
 Plymouth
 Woodsville

Villages

 East Hebron
 Enfield Center
 Etna
 Glencliff
 Lyme Center
 Montcalm
 Pike
 Stinson Lake
 West Lebanon

See also
 National Register of Historic Places listings in Grafton County, New Hampshire

References

External links

 Grafton County official website
 Grafton County profile, from University of New Hampshire Cooperative Extension website
 Grafton County Economic Development Council
 National Register of Historic places of Grafton County

 
Lebanon micropolitan area
1769 establishments in New Hampshire
Populated places established in 1769